Glascoed is a village in Monmouthshire, south east Wales.

Glascoed is mostly associated with the Royal Ordnance Factory nearby at ROF Glascoed. Llandegveth Reservoir is nearby.

External links
www.geograph.co.uk : photos of Glacoed and surrounding area
 Kelly's 1901 Directory of Monmouthshire on Usk and Glascoed etc
 Project tracing life in Glascoed in times past - people and places - initially focussing on the 19th century

Villages in Monmouthshire